Juana de Castro (died 21 August 1374) was queen consort of the Kingdom of Castile, as the wife of King Peter of Castile.

Biography
She was the born into the House of Castro as daughter of Pedro Fernández de Castro and Isabel Ponce de Leon. She was sister to Inês de Castro and Fernando Ruiz de Castro.

In 1354, she was a widow of her marriage to Diego López de Haro and met Peter of Castile. He was attracted to her beauty and Sanabria arranged a marriage. Historian  argued that Castro agreed to marry Peter out of ambition rather than love. As told the chronicler Pero López de Ayala: Castro demanded Peter to nullify his marriage with Blanche of Bourbon; he complied and had bishops  and  carry out the act.

She was pronounced Queen of Castile, though the marriage lasted one day before Peter left her. She was pregnant with their son, Juan, who died a few years after. The only estate she was left with was Dueñas Castle, retiring to the corresponding town.

On 21 August 1374, she died in Dueñas. Her tomb is in the Santiago de Compostela Cathedral.

References

Bibliography

1374 deaths
Castilian queen consorts
House of Castro